Anna Bourma (in Greek Άννα Μπουρμά) (born in Athens, Greece) is a Greek singer of Pontian origin. She studied at New Smyrna Conservatory, and has been working with various artists for more than a decade, including with Yorgos Dalaras, Νikos Zoudiari, Y. Zika, and M. Avdaki. She released her solo album Ta roda tis avlis (in Greek Τα Ρόδα Της Αυλής) in 2011.

Discography

Albums
2011: Ta roda tis avlis (in Greek Τα Ρόδα Της Αυλής)
2014: " Ena tragoudi an swthei" (in Greek Ενα τραγούδι αν σωθεί)

References

External links
Official website
Twitter

21st-century Greek women singers
Singers from Athens
Living people
Year of birth missing (living people)